Moree was an electoral district of the Legislative Assembly in the Australian state of New South Wales, created in 1894 largely replacing Gwydir and including the town of Moree. The district was abolished in 1904 as a result of the 1903 New South Wales referendum, which reduced the number of members of the Legislative Assembly from 125 to 90, and was largely replaced by a recreated Gwydir.

Members for Moree

Election results

Notes

References

Former electoral districts of New South Wales
1894 establishments in Australia
Constituencies established in 1894
1904 disestablishments in Australia
Constituencies disestablished in 1904